This is a list of fictional characters that have appeared in BBC One's science fiction/police procedural drama, Ashes to Ashes.

Main characters
This table is a list of main and recurring characters in the series.

The following table is one detailing a list of the main characters in the series.

1980s characters

Nina Akaboa

Nina Akaboa (Nicole Charles) appears in episode three of the first series as a prostitute who has been raped aboard Leonard Roseberry-Sykes luxury yacht. As Nina is afraid to report the crime, her sex-worker colleague Trixie Walsh reports the rape claiming it to be against herself rather than Nina.

While in Fenchurch East Police Station for an unrelated matter, Nina eventually reveals to DS Ray Carling that it is her who was raped by Ryan Burns, a waiter working on the yacht.

Geoffrey Bevan 
Detective Inspector Geoffrey "Geoff" Bevan (Nicholas Gleaves) is a corrupt Manchester Criminal Investigation Department (CID) copper who comes to London with Detective Chief Inspector (DCI) Derek Litton to hunt Frank Hardwicke, the comedian who saw DI Bevan kill a young black man in cold blood. Bevan is eventually shot as he flees the gala, and as he is dying Gene tells him the truth about the world he is in.

Bill

Bill (Bill Moody) appears in episode six of the second series as an owner of a scrap-yard who attends a neighbourhood watch meeting set up by Stanley Mitchell. While at the meeting, he reveals to DCI Gene Hunt and DI Alex Drake that he has been beaten and run over by local crime-lord, Trevor Riley's men.

After DCI Hunt is attacked by Riley's men in the process of an investigation, Hunt restrains Riley and takes him to Bill's scrap yard and destroys a car with Riley inside it as a form of interrogation

David Bonds

David Bonds (Christopher Fairbank) appears in episode two of the first series as the owner of a public house on the Isle of Dogs. David, his wife Elaine and son George refuse to move from the premises despite the compulsory purchase order as part of the Docklands Development.

Elaine Bonds

Elaine Bonds (Amelda Brown) appears in episode two of the first series as the wife of the above character, David Bonds and the mother of the character below, her son George.

George Bonds

George Bonds (Stephen Wight) appears in episode two of the first series as the son of the two above characters. It later transpires that his father and George plotted to kill Danny Moore, with George eventually detonating a suicide bomb amidst a street party celebrating the Royal Wedding.

Ryan Burns

Ryan Burns (Leo Bill) appears in episode three of the first series as a rapist and murderer committed out of religious extremism. After killing Delfine Parks, he goes on to rape Nina Akaboa aboard Leonard Roseberry-Sykes' yacht, Sunborn where he works as a waiter.

While attempting to rape and murder a third prostitute, the CID team arrive and arrest Burns. Now knowing that Trixie Walsh reported Nina's rape as if it were against herself and that Nina is too scared to testify, Burns would fail to be convicted. Due to this, DS Ray Carling plants cocaine-filled garden gnomes in Burns' car, leading to him being imprisoned for drugs offences.

Micky Dillon

Micky Dillon (Neal Barry) appears in episode five of the second series as a local burglar. He was a member of George Staines' gang during the 1970s.

He is the prime suspect of burglaries in the area, and was initially suspected to have burgled the house of DI Alex Drake's future husband's parents, Bryan and Marjorie Drake.

Bryan Drake
Bryan Drake (Rory MacGregor) is the husband of Marjorie Drake and the father of Peter Drake.  They reside in a house at number 2 Stanley Road.  Having never trusted banks, he keeps his wages at home.

On the morning of 8 November 1982, he and his family are robbed by a burglar who wears a mask of Prime Minister Margaret Thatcher to conceal his identity as George Staines (or, as he is known to the Drakes, their friend Gaynor Mason).  Bryan struggles to defend his family but is shoved by Staines/Mason and strikes his right temple on the table edge.  The wound leaves him deaf for the rest of his life.

He is visited in hospital that day by his future daughter-in-law, DI Alex Drake. After looking to see that the nurses are out of earshot, Alex talks candidly to him about the future, knowing that he cannot hear her.  She acknowledges that she has finally learned that she cannot change the events in her past. [The conversation takes place thirteen months after she failed to prevent her own parents' deaths.]

In coping with his deafness, Bryan takes up painting which he tells his daughter-in-law is the best thing he ever did.  He paints a picture of his grand-daughter, Molly which he gives to Molly's mother, Alex.  After Bryan's son, Peter, abandons Alex and six-month-old Molly, Bryan is the one person who makes Alex believe that it is not the end of her life and career.

Alex's use of past-tense and general delivery when speaking to Bryan in hospital suggest that he dies prior to 2008.

Marjorie Drake
Marjorie Drake (Sophie Stanton) is the wife of Bryan Drake and the mother of Peter Drake.  They reside in a house at number 2 Stanley Road.

On the morning of 8 November 1982, she and her family are robbed by a burglar who wears a mask of Prime Minister Margaret Thatcher to conceal his identity as George Staines (or, as he is known to the Drakes, their friend Gaynor Mason).  Staines/Mason steals approximately £1.000 and some jewellery, including the necklace she was wearing.

Marjorie is confused by the familiarity and sympathy with which she is treated by DI Alex Drake who is, unknown to her, her future ex-daughter-in-law; DCI Gene Hunt explains that DI Drake "takes her community relations very seriously."

In 1996, Marjorie becomes a grandmother with the birth of Peter's daughter, Molly.

Louise Gardiner
DC Louise Gardiner (Zoe Telford) is an undercover officer from a nearby police station who infiltrates a gang of ruthless criminals, the Staffords, under the name Sarah Huddersfield. The gang is run by Terry (Peter Guinness) and Daniel Stafford (Bryan Dick) who are a father and son team who seem to be moving from robbery and other violent crimes into major drug dealing. Gardiner is in place just before the son is released from prison with her mission to help bring down the gang.

Gardiner's superior, DCI Wilson, has a grudge against the father after he was run over by an Austin Allegro during an attempt to stop a bank robbery and appears to have left Gardiner in place with little backup and disregard to her needs for protection during her undercover mission.

Gnome Thief
Gnome Thief (Callum Dixon) is the misnomer by which an otherwise unidentified drugs courier is referred to in the credits.  He and his cohort have cocaine hidden inside of garden gnomes which they attempt to throw into the river when caught by DCI Gene Hunt and his CID team.

Gil Hollis
Gil Hollis (Matthew Macfadyen, husband of series star, Keeley Hawes) is a charity fund-raiser who suffers from obsessive-compulsive disorder.  Hollis claims to have had all the charity money stolen in a robbery in episode 1.7, "Charity Begins at Home".  DCI Gene Hunt and DI Alex Drake figure out that he staged the robbery himself after Hunt realises that Hollis' assailants would have had to drive past the hooligans who saw no second car and notices the blood smears under the suction cups of Hollis' window Garfield, and Drake recognises the scent of portable toilet chemicals on Hollis' blood-stained shirt.  At the end of the episode, Hollis fires several rounds into Luigi's wine bar where the CID are drinking, prompting an angry Hunt to declare that, "I am not dying in a trattoria!".  Hollis explains the staged robbery as a plan to win back his wife and children who had left him for putting starving Africans ahead of his own family's welfare.  Unarmed WPC Sharon "Shaz" Granger gives chase when Hollis takes flight.  With his pocketknife, Hollis retrieves the rolled notes he had hidden in the ends of pipes and throws it all away.  When Shaz arrests him, she falls on his knife, resulting in clinical death.  Hunt and DC Chris Skelton are particularly enraged; Hunt orders the handcuffed Hollis to his knees and allows Chris to brutally beat him up.  DS Ray Carling and Hunt himself join in the retaliatory attack on the "cop killer", ignoring Sergeant Viv James's calls for restraint.  They stop only when Alex's CPR efforts revive Shaz at the last minute.

Derek Litton 
Detective Chief Inspector Derek Litton, QPM (Lee Ross) is the Detective Chief Inspector (DCI) of the Regional Crime Squad. He and DCI Gene Hunt have a long-standing rivalry, the reason for which is unknown. The two departments fight after Gene and Detective Inspector Sam Tyler recover firearms stolen by factory workers, a job that falls under Litton's department. Later in a hostage situation Litton and Gene both have to work together to stop the hostages being killed. However, Litton's methods threaten Sam's and his own life, when Gene kicks him in the stomach and drops him out of the fire zone, proceeding to take a bullet which was blocked by one of his many hip flasks. Litton returns in Ashes to Ashes along with DI Geoffrey "Geoff" Bevan (Nicholas Gleaves), hunting comedian Frank Hardwicke (Roy Hudd) on suspicion of having robbed a police widows' benefit fund (in reality, Hardwicke had witnessed Bevan killing a young black man). Litton was awarded the Queen's Police Medal (distinguished service) some time in the intervening decade, flaunting it to Gene's detectives in Ashes to Ashes.

Charlie Mackintosh
Detective Chief Superintendent Charlie "SuperMac" Mackintosh (Roger Allam) is Gene Hunt's superior. His first appearance is in episode 2.1. He knew details of murdered PC Sean Ervine who was apparently drawn in by Soho's many strip clubs. It was eventually revealed that Mackintosh was having an affair with Ervine's wife, Ruth.

When DI Drake theorises that the initials SM in Ervine's hidden diary indicate a meeting with Mac, she breaks into his office to see if a corresponding entry is also in Mac's diary. Mac had erased the entry, but Alex is able to easily raise the impression with a pencil rub.

Gene initially idolises Mackintosh who is one of the few people in the world Gene respects. At first he appears to be a benevolent character but it soon becomes clear that he is utterly corrupt and greedy. Mackintosh takes bribes but is careful not to spend the money overtly. Rather, he saves for his retirement by investing in art and property through a cover corporation run by the murderer and rapist Ralph Jarvis, who was Mackintosh's classmate in police training and whom Mackintosh cleared of murder in 1977.

He sees Gene as a protégé and eventually compels him to join the Masonic lodge that he and Ray Carling belong to. It is ultimately revealed that Gene has grown to distrust Mackintosh, considering him "bent as a ten bob bit" and he only joined the Masons in order to unravel Mackintosh's plans. Furthermore he holds the Masons in disdain and is "sick to his stomach" to have joined them, having seen their corrupt methods. Mackintosh has let various criminals loose on the streets on account of them being Masons, something which Gene disapproves of.

Mackintosh holds Alex in contempt but views her as a threat. He twice tells Hunt that Drake is 'poisoning' the team. When Hunt refuses to silence Drake after they question Jarvis, Mackintosh frames her for corruption and suspends her, pending criminal prosecution.

Having sworn to bring down SuperMac, Gene and Alex target Jarvis' mansion in the country, finding Mac's pension of artwork and walking into his party of underage virgin girls. Confronting SuperMac with their information, Gene finally asks if he can live with himself knowing he protected Jarvis, playing on his superior's greatest weakness: Mac was once a good man. As Jarvis prepares to walk free, SuperMac draws his sidearm and kills his accomplice, before aiming at his own head. Even after Gene's intervention, he manages to shoot himself fatally in the chest.  His last words are a warning to Gene of an oncoming threat called "Operation Rose".

Despite his apparent death, Mackintosh is heard on the telephone to Hunt in the next episode, demanding better results from the department.

Edward Markham
Edward Markham (Adam James) is a banker in the City, and local playboy whom DCI Gene Hunt suspects of being behind the recent flood of drugs into London.

He is first seen singing along with his Walkman at a party aboard The Lady Di on the morning of 20 July 1981  He manages to avoid the uniformed police officers raiding the party.  Accusing Alex (whom he thinks is a prostitute) of calling the police, he angrily pulls her about and intimidates her until the flashy arrival of DCI Hunt, DS Ray Carling, and DC Chris Skelton in Hunt's Audi Quattro.

Gene Hunt's first line in the series is directed to Markham whom he tells, "Today, my friend, your diary entry will read, 'Took a prozzie hostage and was shot by three armed bastards.'"  Alex uses her hostage negotiating skills to convince him to surrender, lest he be shot by Hunt and his men.  His head is twice slammed into the Quattro by Carling during the arrest.  In custody, Carling confiscates Markham's Walkman and gives it to WPC Shaz Granger.

Despite Hunt's certainty that Markham is a drugs kingpin, Drake immediately sees him for what he truly is: a low-level front-man for a real drugs lord,  as he lacks the requisite inclination toward delegation. "Top flight crime lords," she explains to Hunt, "expect their minions to do their donkey work.  They expend their energy only when it's absolutely necessary. Crime lords don't gloat at police stations, Gene.  They don't spend money on expensive lawyers and then do all the talking themselves, and they are not out to impress Northern flatfoots like you."

While his boss, Arthur Layton, is in custody, Markham attempts to shut down their supply line through a series of nine payphone calls and a message picked up on Charterhouse Lane near Tower Bridge.  He is picked up again - now clad in a cliché 1980s ensemble of double-breasted pinstripe suit, blue shirt with white collar & cuffs, and yellow 'power tie' - and agrees to speak with Hunt ... alone.  He is released shortly thereafter, having purportedly given Hunt the entire network.

Drake sets a trap to prove Markham works for Layton.  She has Skelton and Granger stake out the message drop, having planted an envelope for Markham to take to Layton.  While Skelton goes to urinate, Markham captures Granger.  After beating Skelton, Markham and his henchmen leave with Shaz as insurance that CID will not interfere.  Drake's plan to connect Markham to Layton works, however, as the car in which Markham takes Granger is found to be registered to Layton.

CID find Markham, Layton, their gang, and Granger at a large drugs deal at the docks near Tower Bridge.  During the ensuing gunfight, Markham attempts to flee in Layton's Mercedes which Hunt immobilises with a well-placed shot to its radiator; whereupon, Markham fleas on foot.  Having taken time to gather up several kilograms of cocaine, he is caught by Skelton. Markham's cocky attitude backfires when he taunts the armed Skelton about not being the sort of man who can pull a trigger; Skelton shoots him in the foot.

George Staines/Gaynor Mason
Gaynor Mason (born George Staines on 13 February 1949) (Sara Stewart) is a pre-operative transsexual.

As a boy, Staines hates school, never feeling that he fits in, and never smiles in any of his school photographs.  His favourite treats are his mother's flapjacks which he eats whilst playing old songs for her to sing, such as Cole Porter's "Don't Fence Me In".

As an adult, he leads a gang of vicious criminals in the 1970s and does not think twice about knee-capping his victims.  He cuts off the left leg of a henchman named Charlie for talking about him.

In 1980, Staines stages his own death, and hires "Metal" Micky Dillon to identify the charred corpse of a tramp on whom Staines had planted his sovereign ring.,

Staines flees to Spain for gender reassignment surgery.  After receiving breast implants and cosmetic surgery to her face, she is blackmailed by her surgeons who demand more money or they will inform the authorities about her identity.  She returns to Britain as a blonde woman, adopts the name Gaynor Mason, and sells cosmetics door-to-door.

In 1982, Gaynor becomes friends with Bryan and Marjorie Drake who live a couple of streets away from her childhood home.  She gives their fourteen-year-old son, Peter, a football shirt and tells him that she might take him to a match someday.

Needing money to pay for the next phase of the gender reassignment surgery, Staines/Mason reverts to her former life of crime.  Using her natural male voice and adopting Metal Mickey's modus operandi of wearing a mask of Prime Minister Margaret Thatcher to conceal her identity, Staines robs the Drakes on the morning of 8 November 1982, stealing approximately £1.000 and some jewellery, including the necklace Marjorie was wearing.  Bryan struggles to defend his family but is shoved by Staines and strikes his right temple on the table edge.  The wound leaves him deaf for the rest of his life.

After robbing the Drakes, Staines visits her mother in the guise of Mason in order to bid her good-bye.  Feeling sorry for her, Mason hides £500 of the stolen money in a tin of her flapjacks.

After finding Staines' fingerprints at the Drakes' home, and believing that Mason is Staines' companion rather than Staines himself, DCI Gene Hunt offers Mason money to lure Staines to one of Staines' old haunts, the Peacock pub.  That night, however, she encounters Peter Drake who recognises her necklace as the one stolen from around his mother's neck the day before. Fearing for his life when she chases him, Peter cracks Mason's skull with a brick, retrieves the necklace, and runs away mistakenly thinking he killed her.

Mason's gender and identity are revealed after she comes around in hospital.  In attempting to escape, she takes down Hunt and DS Ray Carling before being kneed in the groin by DC Chris Skelton.  She ultimately confesses in exchange for CID not telling her mother the truth and breaking her heart.

She discourages Carling from resigning from the police and enlisting in the Army, telling him, "I want to go to sleep at night knowing there's  cops like you helping keep good people like my mum safe."

Colin Mitchell
Colin Mitchell (c. 1949-c. 7 or 8 Nov. 1982) (Jason Haigh) is the son of Stanley Mitchell and the husband of Donna Mitchell  Colin's mother is dead from cancer.  He and Donna live beyond their means, trying to maintain appearances.  He buys Donna a lovely house and car, none of it meaning anything to himself.  At Donna's urging, Colin takes a job with the loan shark, Trevor Riley, whereupon his father, Stanley, cuts him out of his life.

Colin takes out a life insurance policy with the intention of disappearing and being declared dead, in order for he and Donna to start a new life together.  He and Donna each have separate reservations to fly to Turkey with him flying on 8 November 1982 and she following on 10 January 1983.  They plan to later send for Stanley.  Colin informs Stanley that he's left Riley's employ, and is taken back by Stanley.  Colin then tells Stanley about the insurance scam that he and his wife Donna have planned to start their new life away from Riley. A furious Stanley pushes Colin who falls and fatally cracks his skull.  Hoping to give meaning to Colin's death, Stanley attempts to frame Riley by applying Riley's trademark spiral brands to Colin's arm before driving the corpse to the wasteland by the canal in Colin's car and dumping the body. Unwilling to stuff his own son's body in the car boot, Stanley gently seats him in the passenger seat, proping him with folded blankets as if to make him comfortable even in death.

He is reported missing by Donna. Days later, on 8 November 1982 his body is discovered floating in the canal by DCI Gene Hunt on the day he was to have flown to Turkey. The coroner opines that the low volume of water in his lungs suggests that he was killed on dry land, and notes the blunt force trauma to his right frontal lobe.  The two facts suggesting murder to DI Alex Drake; while Hunt agrees with the possibility, he offers the alternative theory that Mitchell was drunk, fell, hit his head and fell in the river.  Drake and the coroner agree that the scabbing on Mitchell's wrist wounds suggest they were received at the same time as the head wound.

Donna Mitchell 
Donna Mitchell (Daisy Haggard) is the wife-cum-widow of Colin Mitchell  Having grown up lower class, on the same council estate as Trevor Riley she and Colin live beyond their means to maintain appearances.  Viewing Colin as smarter than Riley, she wants them to share in Riley's wealth; at Donna's urging, Colin takes a job with Riley.  Colin buys her a lovely house and car, none of it meaning anything to himself.

In order to get away from Riley, she and Colin each have separate reservations to fly to Turkey with him flying on 8 November 1982 and she following on 10 January 1983.  They plan to send for Colin's father, Stanley.  In exchange for Riley's promise that he would not touch Colin, Donna allows Riley to copulate with her; Riley films the assignation.

She reports Colin missing.  Days later, when DS Ray Carling and DC Chris Skelton notify her of Colin's death, she insists that he is "just missing" and will not be convinced until the two show her Colin's body. Thereafter, she cannot stop wailing, and Carling and Skelton put her in Hunt's office not knowing what else to do with her.  DI Alex Drake calms her down and asks if Colin had any problems with Trevor Riley.  Donna insists that Riley would never do such a thing.

After DS Ray Carling discovers the flight tickets in Colin's car, she admits to Drake and Hunt that she knew Colin had taken out a life insurance policy and was to disappear when she filed the missing person's report  She takes in Colin's father, Stanley when he discharges himself from hospital after being beaten by Riley's men at Bill's wrecking yard.  After Drake and Carling deduce Stanley's guilt, she and Hunt pretend to arrest Donna, successfully coercing a confession out of Stanley.

Stanley Mitchell
Stanley Mitchell (Tom Georgeson) is the father of Colin Mitchell Some time prior to 1982, Stanley's wife develops cancer. In an effort to get the best for her, Stanley gets money from loan shark Trevor Riley to pay for a private hospital. His efforts were for nought.  His slow repayment prompts Riley and his men to scar Stanley with spiral brands around his left forearm.

When Stanley's son, Colin, goes to work for Riley, Stanley cuts him out of his life.  Colin later tells him he's quit and is taken back by Stanley.  Colin then tells Stanley about the insurance scam that he and his wife Donna have planned to start their new life away from Riley. A furious Stanley pushes Colin who falls and fatally cracks his skull.  Hoping to give meaning to Colin's death, Stanley attempts to frame Riley by applying Riley's trademark spiral brands to Colin's arm before driving the corpse to the wasteland by the canal in Colin's car and dumping the body. Unwilling to stuff his own son's body in the car boot, Stanley gently seats him in the passenger seat, propping him with folded blankets as if to make him comfortable even in death.  After Donna files a missing person's report with the police, Stanley makes a telephone inquiry with the police as well.

When DCI Gene Hunt and DI Alex Drake arrive to notify him of Colin's death, Stanley either assumes or pretends to assume that the pair have come to talk with his fledgling but elderly neighbourhood watch group about community safety.  After the meeting, Hunt and Drake deliver the news of his son's death, and ask about the spiral brands on Colin's arm.  Stanley tells the two of Trevor Riley, a loanshark for whom Colin worked.

Stanley and his cohorts attempt to defend Bill from Riley's men who visit him at his junk yard with the intent of branding him for speaking out about Riley to Hunt and Drake.  Stanley and the others are savagely beaten for their efforts.  He checks himself out of hospital and is taken in by his daughter-in-law, Donna.

After Drake and Carling deduce Stanley's guilt, she and Hunt pretend to arrest Donna, successfully coercing a confession out of Stanley.

Danny Moore
Daniel Moore (Rupert Graves) is on the board of the London Docklands Development Corporation trying to redevelop London's East End. Born in the East End, himself, Moore is a self-made man worth a million pounds or more, and is a personal friend of "the old handbag herself" (i.e., Prime Minister Margaret Thatcher).

On Monday, 27 July 1981  a dynamite bomb at the Royal Docks explodes, killing a dog.  A note soon arrives at Fenchurch East CID, made of letters cut out from magazines, reading "Forget the dog, next time it's Moore. London Liberation Front"  WPC Sharon "Shaz" Granger suggests that the Moore in question is Daniel Moore, prompting Hunt to call her a "lobotomised Essex Girl."

Nevertheless, Hunt and Drake proceed to Moore's office.  Drake is intrigued to be meeting "a real, living, breathing 'Thatcherite' businessman," with whom she promptly begins to flirt in front of Hunt.  Moore declines Hunt's offer of protection.

Moore stops by CID to take Drake for a ride in his DeLorean, in which he asks her out to dinner that evening.  They discover an alarm-clock bomb hidden under the seat with a note to frighten Moore, "On wedding day, you die," but it frightens Drake quite a bit more, causing her to pound on car and scream uncontrollably "Get me out, get out!" while remembering the car bombing that killed (or, rather, will kill) her parents.  Though they both laugh after the bomb only rings without exploding, Drake's laughs turn to sobs.  Moore accepts Hunt's earlier offer of police protection in the person of Drake, and the two dine together at Luigi's, where Moore asks her what she would like to do that night; she responds him, "I would really like to see if you could surprise me. I would love to know if that is possible."

Surprise her he does, by taking her to the Blitz nightclub in Covent Garden where 'Boy' George O'Dowd checks Alex's coat. The two dance and kiss, but go no further that night.  The next night, however, after being rebuked by her mother, Drake seeks to "piss off that portion of [Drake's] id that conjured up [her] mother;" Drake tarts herself up to seduce Moore, knowing that her mother would never approve of the Thatcherite, and that no one in the real world will know that she fantasised about shagging him.  When Moore's elevator opens, however, Drake finds him in flagrante delicto with another woman, and departs.

Moore invites CID to a street party on 29 July in the Bonds' neighbourhood to celebrate both the royal wedding and the redevelopment of the Docklands which, he claims, will not only provide a job to every man there, but make money for the property owners.  Alone, later, Moore makes Drake an open offer of a job before George Bonds shouts to the crowd, "We are all prostitutes,"  and detonates his suicide bomb, killing only himself.

Boy George O'Dowd
Boy George (born George Alan O'Dowd, 14 June 1961) (actor uncredited); still a year and a half away from becoming a household name with Culture Club; is a Blitz Kid working in the coat check at Blitz nightclub in Covent Garden when Danny Moore takes DI Alex Drake dancing there on the night of Monday, 27 July 1981.  Drake recognises him when he takes her coat and welcomes her to Blitz, happily responding to him, "Thanks, George!"

WPC Sharon "Shaz" Granger is presumably acquainted with Boy George, as she frequents the club and considers some of the Blitz regulars to be her best friends.

Delfine Parks
Delfine Parks (c. 1959-c. June 1981) is described by DCI Gene Hunt as being Black, in her early twenties, and approximately 5'2" (158 cm)  Parks is a regular church-goer and a member of the choir where she meets fellow choir member, Ryan Burns whom he is courting and who gives her his Saint Christopher medal.

After work one evening, she has something to eat and tells her mother she is going to church although there was no choir practice that night.  When she and Burns meet up, she rejects him; out of rage, he rips the St. Christopher medal off of her neck, slashes, strangles and kills her.  Delfine's body is found in June 1981,  beaten and strangled by Burns who slashes her breast and leaves a lesion on the side of her neck, all in an unorganised fashion.

Mrs. Parks
Mrs. Parks is the mother of the late Delfine Parks  She still hears Delfine's voice in her church choir and hopes to never stop hearing it.

Caroline Price
Caroline Price, LL.B., (1945 - 10:00, 10 October 1981) (Amelia Bullmore) is Alex Drake's mother and Tim Price's wife. A high-profile defence solicitor, she practices with her barrister husband.  She is considered by Gene Hunt to be "lefty", and is particularly opposed to police corruption and incompetence.  She is one of a group of lawyers who have been trying to lay the foundation for  slavery reparations.  She and Tim are friends of liberal police reformer, Lord Leslie Scarman. The Prices keep a spare key to their townhouse under a concrete turtle to the left of the front steps; young Alex is familiar enough with the hidden key to retrieve it in adulthood.  At 21:00, 26 July 1981 news coverage includes footage of Caroline's press conference following the acquittal of a man against whom the Metropolitan Police were discovered to have fabricated evidence.

In episode 1.4, "The Missing Link", it is revealed that Caroline has been having an affair with their associate Evan White, and had been involved in a government cover-up.  From the top of the stairs, young Alex sees Caroline and Evan kissing.

On Tuesday, 28 July 1981, Caroline arrives at the Fenchurch East police station to represent George Bonds, a teenaged bombing suspect whose confession DI Alex Drake is concerned will be excused by the courts if obtained without a solicitor; Drake has referred George to Caroline in order to meet the woman whom only Drake knows to be her mother.  Just as she storms into CID, Caroline is appalled to find a woman bent over a desk, skirt up, yelling at DCI Gene Hunt, "Would you please just stamp my arse?!"  After gasping, "Mum," and correcting herself to say, "Bum," a nervous Drake offers her hand to her unsuspecting mother, telling her how pleased she is to meet her and how she admires her, which Caroline assumes to be police sarcasm before demanding to speak with her client, George. George denies knowing the source of the dynamite, and Drake and Caroline orally spar over Caroline's accusation that the police would plant the dynamite to frame George and clear the case;  Drake eventually calls the condescendingly smug Caroline "a rude bitch"; and theorises that George may be her parents' killer in less than eleven weeks' time, suggesting that, "He may repay you by  blowing you to kingdom come," at which time, Hunt, taken aback, turns to face her.

Caroline surprises Drake by waiting for her outside of the police station and asking to have a drink. Over wine at Luigi's, Caroline apologises for embarrassing "a fellow female in a male profession".  Drake encourages Caroline to tell her about the latter's daughter, Alex Price (i.e., Drake's younger self). Caroline describes her as, "Bright as a penny, but easily distracted." When Drake declines her request to betray her colleagues' trust and report their actions to Caroline, the latter chastises former, stating, ironically, "Thank God, the only thing my daughter shares with you is her name. I'd be ashamed if she grew up to be like you."  In order to "piss off that portion of [Drake's] id that conjured up [her] mother," Drake tarts herself up to seduce Moore, knowing that her mother would never approve of the Thatcherite, and that no one in the real world will know that she fantasised about shagging him.  When Moore's elevator opens, however, Drake finds him in flagrante delicto with another woman and departs.

The next day, 29 July 1981, when all of young Alex's classmates have stayed home to watch the royal wedding of Prince Charles and Lady Diana Spencer with their respective parents, Caroline leaves her daughter alone at school, and admonishes a faculty member, "Make sure she concentrates.  She's easily distracted." Instead of spending the day with her daughter, she returns to Fenchurch East to tend to her client, George, from whom CID have obtained a confession.  Caroline Price's arrival and accusation that Drake is incompetent prompts the retort, "At least I'm not out trying to score cheap points off coppers while my daughter is stuck at school on her own for the royal wedding," and the more confusing, "I have felt guilty about that all my life, but not any more; she is your daughter!"

That night, Drake writes "Mum Dad" on the final day of her butcher paper wall calendar, 10 October 1981, and draws a red crux ordinaria to mark their forthcoming deaths.  She considers the possibilities that she can save their lives and that her reason for being in 1981 is to do so.  As if on cue, Caroline drops by to see how Drake is following being nearly killed by George's suicide bomb that afternoon.  Drake admits to being "a mess"; Caroline offers words of encouragement.  Unlike Drake and the audience, Caroline is unaware of the irony of Caroline comforting her daughter in the wake of witnessing a bombing.  Caroline assures Drake that she had no idea that George was capable of such an act.  Drake invites her in, but is very happy that Caroline has to decline because it is in order to pick up Drake's younger self from school.

Caroline and Drake gradually develop mutual respect and fondness over the course of the first series. In episode 1.6, "Over the Hill", adult Alex leaves eight-year-old murder witness, Donny Cale, in Caroline's care overnight while young Alex is away on a school trip.  Caroline confides in adult Alex on that she is going to take two years off work in order to spend time with her daughter, and says how much she loves young Alex.

The next day, 10 October 1981, Caroline and young Alex are to be driven by Tim to a railway station for a three-day trip. Caroline is unaware that her client Arthur Layton (Sean Harris) was hired by Tim to plant a bomb in the car. The bomb detonates at or about 10:00 a.m., killing both Tim and Caroline but sparing young Alex who had alighted to fetch her escaped balloon whilst the road was blocked.  Both young and adult Alex witness the horrifying explosion.

Approximately thirteen months later, Caroline haunts adult Alex in her dreams after Alex sees fellow time-traveller, Martin Summers, kill his younger self, thereby demonstrating that the timeline is not fixed.  Alex's vision of Caroline chastises a guilt-ridden Alex for having failed to save her life. Later in the episode, however, Alex asks her mother what she can do and Caroline responds that Alex will keep fighting and go back to Molly "because you're her mother".

Tim Price
Timothy Price, QC (1942 - 10:00, 10 October 1981) (Andrew Clover, not credited until episode 8, "Alex's Big Day" in order to hide the Clown Angel of Death's true identity) is the father of Alex Drake (née Alexandra Price) and both the husband and law partner of Caroline Price.  He is a high-profile barrister defending accused criminals and is involved with numerous anti-establishment movements.  In episode 1.4, "The Missing Link", CID discover that Tim had represented members of the Revolutionary Worker's Front to get them off criminal charges, and was also involved in a government cover-up along with Caroline.  They are friends of police reformer, Lord Scarman.

His young daughter, Alex Price, enjoys playing in his office as he works, and runs about in his court wig; the inside lid of his wig case contains a picture she drew of their family (episode 1.8, "Alex's Big Day").  He reads to her at night from The Lion, the Witch and the Wardrobe, producing different voices for the different characters.

It is revealed in episode 1.4, "The Missing Link" that Tim has been cuckolded by Caroline with their associate, Evan White.  The two break off the affair and are unaware when Tim learns of it.

On Friday, 9 October 1981, he is visited by DI Alex Drake (whom he is unaware is his daughter), who warns him that someone is out to kill Caroline and him and pleads with him to change his routine and/or seek police protection.  He assures adult Alex that people are always threatening to kill him and that he will not be intimidated.  Having failed to reason with him, Drake arrests Tim and Caroline on trumped-up drugs possession charges in order that they will not be killed by a car bomb the next morning.  The two are released early the next morning, 10 October 1981, before Drake arrives for duty.  (episode 1.8, "Alex's Big Day").

That morning, Tim Price borrows Evan White's blue Ford Escort in order to drive Caroline and Alex to the railway station. While the Prices and Gene Hunt and adult Alex are stopped on either side of a lorry turning around in the middle of the road at 10:00 in the morning, young Alex exits the Escort to fetch a balloon which has escaped through her open window, and adult Alex exits Hunt's Quattro to save her parents' lives. In front of adult Alex's horrified eyes, Tim appears to change into the Clown and wink at her.  Adult Alex has only enough time to process the sight and ask, "Dad?" before the car explodes, killing both Tim and Caroline in view of Alex's young and adult eyes.

Subsequently, a video is found in which Tim explains that, having discovered Caroline's affair with Evan White, Tim does not want to live a "life of quiet desperation".  He intends to kill himself, Caroline, and "our beloved daughter, Alexandra."

Trevor Riley
Trevor Riley (Sam Spruell), having grown up lower class on the same council estate as Donna Mitchell is a former seller of designer knock-offs. In 1982, he is the principal of Trevor Riley Financial, a loan shark posing as a legitimate financial investments broker.  He and his minions rule by intimidation and violence.  They burn spiral scars onto victims' arms.  Three of them beat Bill with baseball bats and drag him under the wheels of their car.

Donna Mitchell allows Riley to copulate with her in exchange for Riley's promise that he will not touch her husband and his employee, Colin Mitchell.  Riley films the assignation.

Riley is smart enough to have kept his operation under CID's radar. until the death of Colin Mitchell who had been killed by his own father, Stanley. Stanley attempts to frame Riley for the death by applying Riley's trademark spiral brands to Colin's arm and naming Riley when Hunt and Drake question him about Colin's death.  Riley is unintimidated by Hunt and tosses him the business card of his solicitor.  He asks Hunt if, hypothetically, he were to have killed Colin, why would he have signed the crime with his supposedly trademark spiral brands?  He threatens to charge Hunt with harassment, Hunt staples Riley's necktie to the desk.  Although despising Riley, Drake agrees that the branding looks like a frame.

Riley's men visit Bill at his junk yard with the intention of branding him for speaking out about Riley to Hunt and Drake.  They beat Stanley and the others who attempt to defend Bill.  This prompts Hunt to break into Riley's office at night in search of evidence.  They find the VHS tape of Riley's liaison with Donna Mitchell, locked in a file cabinet. Riley comes back that night, but the attempts by DS Ray Carling and DC Chris Skelton to warn Hunt and Drake are foiled by dead radop batteries.  In desperation, Carling and Skelton shatter Riley's car window to set off its alarm and steal the car, just as Riley is approaching his office door.  Riley holds on to Carling as they drive away, but soon falls in the parking lot and sees Drake and Hunt leave the scene.

Riley exacts revenge against Hunt and Drake, having his henchmen beat Hunt with bats Drake hides behind her couch when they break into her darkened flat; instead of searching the flat, they merely destroy her television and depart.  The next morning, Hunt seeks solace in a jail cell to plot his retribution,. and refuses to promise Drake that he will do it the right way.

Hunt cuffs Riley walking out of his office and drives him in a recovered car to Bill's junkyard.  Sending Bill off for a half hour with some cash, Hunt climbs into the crane cab and destroys the car with Riley still in the back seat as an interrogation technique.  Drake and company arrive in Hunt's Quattro to reveal the real killer.  Riley and the car nevertheless plunge several metres when Hunt releases the crane.  In the end, Carling and Skelton arrest Riley for a long list of unpaid parking tickets.

Leonard Roseberry-Sykes
Leonard Roseberry-Sykes (Simon Molloy) is the owner of the luxury yacht Sunborn where he hosts parties.  Roseberry-Sykes is characterised by DCI Gene Hunt as being "a bigger pain in the arse than a bad dose of piles  More importantly to Hunt, however, Roseberry-Sykes and Police Commissioner Sir David McNee are both Freemasons or, in Hunt's words, "members of the funny handshake brigade."

Ryan Burns works as a waiter at Roseberry-Sykes' yacht parties.  As Hunt expects, he is quite upset when Drake arrests Burns during a party in early August 1981 and informs him that a rape took place aboard his yacht two nights earlier.  DS Ray Carling's assault of another attendee only worsens the situation, and Hunt has to field a telephone call from an angry Commissioner McNee.

Elsie Staines
Elsie Staines (Rita Davies) is the elderly mother of gangster, George Staines.  Struggling to make ends meet on her small pension, she uses a space heater to keep her sitting room very warm because of her rheumatism, and she never misses Pebble Mill at One.  She resides a couple of streets away from Bryan and Marjorie Drake.

When George was a boy, Elsie would sing old songs while he accompanied her on the piano and ate her flapjacks.  In 1980, she buries a man she believes to be her son.

On the morning 8 November 1982, Elsie is visited by Gaynor Mason, a woman claiming to be an old friend of George. In reality, Mason is her partially gender-reassigned son, George, coming to bid Elsie good-bye.  Feeling sorry for her, Mason hides £500 of the stolen money in a tin of her flapjacks.

Shortly before 13.00 that afternoon, the money is discovered by DCI Gene Hunt when he and DI Alex Drake interview Elsie concerning the discovery of George's fingerprints in the Drakes' house.

Later that afternoon or the next morning, Elsie is shocked to discover the £500 in the biscuit tin.  Not knowing how it got there, she refuses to keep that which is not hers and posts it in the mail to the Drakes.

In exchange for Mason's confession, Hunt arrests her under that name, declining the opportunity to take credit for collaring the infamous George Staines - so as not to break Elsie's heart.

Steve Strange
Steve Strange (born Steven John Harrington on 28 May 1959) (portrayed by himself) is the lead singer of Visage and the host at Blitz nightclub in Covent Garden.  When Danny Moore takes DI Alex Drake dancing at Blitz on the night of Monday, 27 July 1981, Strange and Visage are performing their "new single" "Fade to Grey". [Although it was released on 10 November 1980, more than eight months before the depicted performance.]

Street Girl 1
Street Girl 1 (Leanne Lakey) is a prostitute who tells DI Alex Drake in early August 1981 that fellow prostitute Trixie Walsh is "OK, unless you get on the wrong side of her."  Drake tells her to call if any girls go missing.  A day later, she informs Drake that Ryan Burns has taken Street Girl 2 toward the river in a white Ford Escort

Street Girl 2
Street Girl 2 (Tracey Wiles) is a prostitute who tells DI Alex Drake in early August 1981 that fellow prostitute Trixie Walsh "has a soft spot for the lame ducks."  Drake tells her to call if any girls go missing.  Rapist/murder Ryan Burns hires her a day later and drives her to an abandoned warehouse near the river, where CID find her being held by Burns at knifepoint.

Trixie Walsh
Trixie Walsh (Claire Rushbrook) is a prostitute and colleague of Nina Akaboa who tells her in early August 1981 of being raped and cut by Ryan Burns.  With Nina too scared and humiliated to testify, Trixie reports to Sergeant Viv James' reception desk to file a rape complaint.  She tells DCI Gene Hunt and DI Alex Drake occurred at a party aboard Leonard Roseberry-Sykes' luxury yacht Sunborn moored near Tower Bridge.  Although she has cut herself on her left breast where Nina Akaboa and Delfine Parks were cut, Walsh's cut is different in that it is much less deep and appears organised whereas Delfine's injuries were disorganised; Walsh also lacks the lesion found on the other two.

Her story comes into doubt when DS Ray Carling discovers that she has been fired by her escort agency for taking money from a client who refused to pay, and Hunt suspects that she made up the story to damage the reputation of the agency as being one whose escorts cry 'rape'.  After the extremely religious Burns swears on a Holy Bible that he has never even seen Walsh, Hunt is certain that she creating the story, and wants to know why.  Despite her initial refusal to tell Hunt the truth, she finally opens up about Nina.

Zippy and George

Zippy (Ronnie Le Drew) and George (Mark Mander) (both voiced by Roy Skelton) are puppet characters from the children's television programme, Rainbow, which was produced by Thames Television for ITV between 1972 and 1992.

In Episode 1.1, "Deja Vu", Alex Drake sees Zippy and George on television and expects them to start talking to her in a manner similar to Sam Tyler's experiences with television during his coma. In a later dream scene (presumably Alex's) they do indeed speak, but to Alex's daughter, Molly Drake, telling her that Alex will never return to her.  The dream sequence appears as if an episode of Rainbow, albeit one set in the Fenchurch East CID anteroom.  In the scene, Zippy wears a Metropolitan Police Service peaked cap and wields a traditional police truncheon.

2008 characters

Molly Drake
Molly Drake (born 1996) (Grace Vance) is the twelve-year-old daughter of Alex Drake and Peter Drake.  She is named for Caroline Price's grandmother, a suffragette, and coincidentally shares her name with her father's childhood cat.  Molly's father abandons her and her mother when Molly is six months old. Her mother commonly addresses her as "Molls" as her father called his cat.  Her proper name and nickname are extraordinarily similar to the two nicknames by which her mother is normally addressed by Gene Hunt: "Bolly" and "Bolls". Like her mother, Molly is the goddaughter of Evan White who calls her "Scraps".

Her paternal grandfather, Bryan Drake, paints her portrait for Alex.

Her voice is first heard reading from Sam Tyler's file in the opening scene of episode 1.1, "Deja Vu", while her mother drives her to school through central London; the notes she reads are the same post-coma statement Sam narrates at the start of episodes 1.2-2.8 of Life on Mars, and lead her to scoff, "Whatever. That is so lame!"  She is celebrating her twelfth birthday in 2008 when the series begins; Evan has given her a BlackBerry as a present and is getting her a "seriously chocolaty" cake; her father Peter is travelling in Canada with a woman named Judy and is not believed to have sent her a birthday present. That morning, she relishes the chance to place the flashing blue emergency light on her mother's car herself in order to go "blues and twos". Molly is briefly held at gunpoint by Arthur Layton when she defies Alex's instructions to remain in the car.  After the hostage situation, Alex tells her, "It's a hard, screwed-up world but, if you trust me, I will try to help you get through it."  Alex then leaves her in the care of Evan while Alex attends to reports, promising to be at Molly's birthday party in time to blow out the candles on her cake together. Unbeknownst to Molly, Alex is abducted by Layton moments later.

Late that night, Molly travels to the hospital where Alex is taken for surgery after being discovered with Layton's gunshot wound to her head.

After Alex is sent back in time, Molly acts as something akin to the Test Card Girl of Life on Mars, frequently appearing to Alex as hallucinations at points throughout the series.  Alex cannot observe Molly directly, but either senses her presence in the room or sees her in reflections and in her peripheral vision; Molly vanishes whenever Alex turns to look directly at her.  The Clown Angel of Death (Molly's maternal grandfather) occasionally speaks to Alex in Molly's voice in the first series.  At the end of episode 1.1, "Deja Vu", the Molly-voiced clown tells her, "You've just been shot, a second ago.  You are lying on the wet ground.  Don't fight to wake up; it will hurt too much.  You'll never make it to her party.  All those memories, but it doesn't have to hurt."

Alex directs many of her audiotaped progress notes toward Molly and frequently talks to her.  Getting back to Molly, especially before the birthday party, is Alex's overarching goal.  Her line to Molly about the state of the world and trust, is repeated verbatim back to her by DCI Gene Hunt after the 1981 climax scene of episode 1.1, "Deja Vu".

The exception to Alex's inability to look straight at Molly is when Molly appears as if cast in 1980s television programmes.  Molly looks for her mother while interacting with Zippy and George in episode of Rainbow set in the Fenchurch East CID office.  Molly later appears in a 1982 episode of Grange Hill in which she is questioned about her mother by head teacher Bridget McClusky.  Molly Drake appears in a 1982 episode of Angels where she is told by a woman off-camera that Alex will not wake up for a very long while.  Alex later hears her (through Luigi's radio) being told that Alex is "doing really well," and that "the operation was a complete success;" they need only wait for her to wake up.

A moment after Alex awakens from her coma in 2008, an overjoyed Molly is brought to her bedside for a brief visit.  As Molly exits to give her mother some rest, she and the draped corpse of Martin Summers cross paths in the corridor.  In a reversal, once Molly is away, Gene Hunt appears to Alex on the video screens; albeit on hospital diagnostic monitors, whereas Molly would appear on Alex's 1980s television in Hunt's absence.

When Alex dies and Gene Hunt slaps her "awake" into the Geneverse purgatory in the season 3 première, Molly's jacket is on the chair in Alex's hospital or hospice room. In the finale, Molly appears in a dream, supporting her mother in an It's a Knockout style game, against Gene Hunt, both Alex and Gene are foam rubber suit versions of themselves. Molly repeatedly shouts to her mother to "Get up!" because "He's coming!"

2008 and 1980s characters

The Clown
The Clown (Andrew Clover) is the main antagonist during the first series, dressed in a Pierrot costume resembling that worn by David Bowie in the music video for Ashes to Ashes and on the album cover, appears to have a similar role to the Test Card Girl from Life On Mars, offering Alex Drake cryptic messages, often in her daughter's voice.  Unlike the Test Card Girl, the Clown frequently appears in the background of scenes.  On Andrew Clover's website the character is referred to as The Angel of Death.

In any near death experiences adult Alex has until 10 October 1981, the Clown appears, often distorted and blurred out of Alex's own vision. The clown stalks Alex frequently throughout the first series. In the seventh episode of the series the clown speaks in what is clearly Alex's father's voice while delivering a dangerous threat.

It is seen in the climax of episode 1.8, "Alex's Big Day" that the clown and Drake's father, Tim Price, are one and the same person. Moments before his death, Tim Price removes his glasses, and is perceived by adult Alex to transform into the clown before smiling and winking at her. Startled by the horrific revelation, she has only time enough to ask "Dad?" before the car detonates in front of her.

The Clown is briefly visible to WPC Sharon Granger when she is stabbed and approaches clinical death in episode 1.7, "Charity Begins at Home". She pleads with DC Chris Skelton, "Tell it to go away! I don't like clowns!"

Since her parents' deaths, adult Alex is no longer stalked by the Clown. The Clown (or, arguably, David Bowie in the same Pierrot costume) appears in the lower left area of Luigi's celebrity mural at the close of Episode 1.8, at which time neither Alex nor Shaz seems to take any notice when walking toward it,; it is gone again from the mural in the second series.

Peter Drake
Peter Drake (Perry Millward in 1982; unseen in 2008) is a fourteen year-old boy in 1982, at which time he lives with his parents, Bryan Drake and Marjorie Drake, at Number 2, Stanley Road, in London.  Adult Alex characterises him as "an untrustworthy, two-timing, two-faced, spineless, selfish, little shit".

He is smitten with a girl named Suzie.  He enjoys the game Perfection.  He hates hospitals and though he is reluctant to admit it, football.  His musical tastes are anachronistic as his records in 1982 include one by Shakespears Sister who do not form until 1988; alternatively, given the exceptionally relevant lyrics of their 1991 single shown, "Stay", the record's presence in his room may be no more corporeal than were The Clown Angel of Death's appearances throughout the first series.

He unknowingly first meets his future wife, the adult DI Alex Drake, on 8 November 1982, after his parents' home is burgled and his father deafened.  The following night, he sees his parents' friend Gaynor Mason wearing the necklace that had been stolen from around his mother's neck. Fearing for his life when she chases him, Peter cracks Mason's skull with a brick, retrieves the necklace, and runs away mistakenly thinking he killed her.

He eventually meets Alex Price, a girl roughly five years his junior.  Peter confides in her about his assault on Gaynor Mason only insofar as to tell her that he "did a bad thing" when he was a teenager.  Although he prefers to be called 'Peter', Alex will tend to call him 'Pete'.  Alex becomes familiar with the loud 'creak' of Peter's bed in his parents' house, and he shows her that he keeps his marijuana stash inside of a  square, blue satchel. Despite having been admonished not to by Alex's older self years earlier, Peter condescendingly tells Alex that her bad mood is the result of premenstrual tension.  He also blames her when they run out of petrol while he is driving her across France and have to wait out a pouring rainstorm for hours, again despite her elder self's specific instruction not to blame her.  Instead of getting a job to support his wife, Alex, Peter lies around in bed, "working on the novel that only exists in his head".  Alex never realises during their relationship that his 'tell' when lying is to put his hands in his pockets and look down.

In 1996, Peter fathered Molly Drake, named after Peter's childhood cat.  Six months after Molly's birth, Peter abandons his family, leaving Alex as Molly's custodial parent, "never to be seen again".  Molly inherits Peter's tendency to put her hands in her pockets and look at the floor when lying.  He is travelling in Canada with a woman named Judy in 2008 at the time of Molly's twelfth birthday and Alex's shooting, and is not believed to have sent Molly a birthday present.

Alex remains resentful of Peter's selfishness and irresponsibility.  Despite telling Peter's father that she has realised that she cannot change her timeline, Adult Alex tries to instill some behavioural changes in her younger self's future husband.  In exchange for not arresting him for assaulting Gaynor Mason, Peter promises her that he will look after his parents and be nice to whatever girl he ends up with, "be it Suzie or a girl called Alex." Her direction that he look after Molly is naturally lost on Peter who understands her to mean his cat which peeks her head out from under his bed and meows at that moment. Since, it was revealed Alex has died, it is possible that Peter will have to raise Molly.

Keith Harris and Orville the Duck
Ventriloquist Keith Harris (born 21 September 1947) (portrayed by himself in archival footage and new audio) and his puppet, Orville the Duck, provide insight to DI Alex Drake concerning her condition in 2008.  The two appear on Drake's television on or before the night of 7 November 1982, and awaken her from her sleep.  Orville is miserable (mispronounced 'miserabable') because he is worried about Alex and thinks she is going to die.  Harris claims that she is not going to die, reminds Orville that she is at the hospital, and reveals that there were two beautiful bouquets of flowers already at the hospital for her before she arrived.  None of this makes Orville happy.  Drake talks to her television, telling Orville that he should be happy that she's made it to the hospital, and appears to take no note of the fact one or two parties were able to send flowers in time to arrive before her ambulance.

Morph Kiddizase
Morph Kiddizase is a plasticine-like kid animated by Tony Hart on Take Hart (from 1977) and Hartbeat (from 1984). He appears on a programme that DI Alex Drake is watching in 1982 as she perceives her body being defibrulated in 2008.  In Hartbeat, some characters rename him as Kiddizase, making his full name Morph Kiddizase.

The analogous characters in Life on Mars are the stop-motion animated versions of Sam Tyler, Gene Hunt and a random nonce, in Sam's drug-induced Camberwick Green hallucination in episode 2.5.

Arthur Layton
Arthur Layton (Sean Harris) is a criminal with a talent for using explosives.  He is uncomfortable with people staring at him and wears mirrored sunglasses to hide his eyes.  It is his gunshot which sends the programme's protagonist, Alex Drake, back in time from 2008 to 1981.

On the same morning as her arrival in the past, 7 July 1981, DI Alex Drake notices Layton's name on the side of a Betamax video cassette on a shelf in the Fenchurch East police station's electronics storage room.  To DCI Gene Hunt, he is merely a tinker with a minor record whom Hunt tolerates in exchange for periodic information.  Drake, however, is certain that his surveillance tape would not be there if Layton were not crucial.  In the surveillance tape, he wears a t-shirt depicting the cover of David Bowie's Scary Monsters (And Super Creeps) album which includes the song, "Ashes to Ashes".

Layton's criminal record includes convictions for fencing stolen property through his junk business in Shadwell, but Drake believes him to be the kingpin behind a drugs smuggling operation in the city.  Drake and DC Chris Skelton pay him a visit and Drake orders him arrested for no apparent reason.  He is unintimidated by Drake's interrogation, denying all involvement in the drugs trade, and is quickly released by Hunt.  While in custody, his subordinate, Edward Markham, attempts to shut down their supply line through a series of nine payphone calls and a message picked up on Charterhouse Lane near Tower Bridge.

Drake visits his junk shop again and leaves with his encoded notebook.  Hunt takes the notebook from a drunken Drake that evening and shows it to DS Ray Carling who doesn't know what to make of the numbers.  Drake's attempt to link Markham and Layton results in the kidnapping of WPC Shaz Granger, but succeeds in linking the two men, as the car in which Markham takes Granger is found to be registered to Layton.  Also found to be registered to Layton are boats including The Prince Charlie.  That revelation causes Hunt to realise that the numeric code in Layton's notebook are tide times for shipping the drugs.

CID find Markham, Layton, their gang, and Granger at a large drugs deal at the docks near Tower Bridge, and Drake admonishes her team that she needs Layton alive.  He takes Granger hostage at gunpoint during the ensuing gunfight and is pursued by Drake.  In his 1981 stand-off with Drake, Layton holds Granger in the same manner that he will hold the woman hostage in 2008 when Alex similarly approaches him. In 1981, however, Drake is armed and aiming at his head.  The stand-off is broken by Hunt who arrives via a commandeered speedboat with Carling and Skelton, allowing Granger to escape.  Drake arrests him for, not only drug trafficking and abduction, but additionally for shooting her in the head which he will not do for twenty-seven years.  Hunt sprays Layton's direction with an Uzi, only wounding him superficially.  Despite Drake's wishful thinking, Layton's arrest does not result in her return to 2008.

Layton is later released from jail near the end of episode 1.8, "Alex's Big Day" through the efforts of his barristers, Tim Price and Evan White and is commissioned by Tim Price to install a suicide bomb in White's car which Tim borrows under the pretext of driving Caroline and young Alex Price to the train station.  Layton wires the bomb trigger to the car's cassette tape player.  While riding in the back seat, young Alex sees Layton walking down the road as they pass him.  He watches from the hillside as the bomb detonates, killing Tim and Caroline, but sparing young Alex who had alighted the stopped car to fetch her balloon which had escaped through the window.  In the excitement, his presence is apparently unnoticed by Hunt and adult Alex Drake, as neither rushes to arrest him on suspicion of murder.

On several occasions in 1981 and 2008, he quotes the lyric "I'm happy, hope you're happy too" from David Bowie's song, Ashes to Ashes.  The song plays on the car's cassette player leading up to the bomb's detonation.

In 2008, Layton is down-and-out, still bearing the scar on his left cheek from Hunt's 9mm Uzi round twenty-seven years earlier, his crime empire merely a memory.  One morning, he takes a woman hostage on the embankment in front of the Tate Modern, and demands to speak specifically with DI Alex Drake, causing Drake to detour on her way to delivering her daughter Molly Drake to school her twelfth birthday,

He holds the hostage in the same manner has he held Granger twenty-seven years earlier.  When Alex manages to cause Layton to release his civilian hostage in favour of herself, Molly defies Alex's instruction to remain in the car and approaches through the crowd of observers.  Although Layton's name and aged face mean nothing to Drake, he tells her, "I knew you when you were a little girl.  You've got your mother's eyes, Alex," and proceeds to twice taunt her with the lyrics "I'm happy; hope you're happy too," from David Bowie's 1980 hit single "Ashes to Ashes" before cocking his revolver's hammer and saying, "Boom!"  This prompts a frightened Molly to rush past the barricade tape toward her mother, whereupon Layton takes Molly hostage instead and leads her down the steps toward the river's edge, threatening to kill her if followed.  Drake puts herself in between the police sharpshooters and Layton & Molly, whilst repeatedly screaming "Hold your fire!" to the former.  When Layton fires, Drake rushes down the steps, to find Molly unharmed and Layton gone.

Later, at approximately 10:00 that morning, after Alex has sent Molly home with her godfather, Alex gets into her car, still parked on the south bank, without noticing Layton sitting in wait for her in the back seat. With his revolver to her head, he directs her to drive to an old, apparently abandoned barge on the north bank, opposite The O₂.  Walking swiftly to the barge, he claims that she will be his "ticket out of this mess," before placing a call on his mobile phone and telling the other party, "You're gonna  have to listen, 'cause I've got a piece of your past standing  right here in front of me: Tim and Caroline Price's daughter; and I'm gonna  tell her the truth why her parents died."  The party whom Layton telephones in 2008 is not yet revealed conclusively.  At the end of episode 1.8, "Alex's Big Day", adult Alex Drake opines in 1981 that Evan White is whom Layton calls, telling Hunt that "I'm the piece of his [Evan's] past, or I will be.  He'll be blackmailed by Layton for not telling the truth."

Once in the barge, Layton laments his lost success, telling Alex, "I had an empire back in the day.  I had connections; I had dealers on every street corner."  Alex uses her psychological training and experience in an attempt to calm Layton and save her own life.  Her attempt fails, and Layton decides not to reveal the truth about her parents' death before shooting her in the head.  In the instant Layton's bullet impacts her, Alex sees a series of disconnected images, which include Layton shooting her instant before, and a childhood memory of seeing Layton as a young man walking beside the road as she rides past him.

BBC News soon report Drake's disappearance and the police's suspicion of Layton's culpability; Layton is described as "dangerous and armed".  A poster seen in Series 2, Episode 8, states that Layton is still at large in 2008.  While the precise amount of time that has elapsed while Alex is in hospital is not stated, the statements by Molly and medical personnel which Alex hears during her surgery, infection, and treatment of her infection suggest that a scant few days have passed since Layton's abduction and shooting of her on Molly's birthday.

Evan White

Evan White, LL.B. (Stephen Campbell Moore) is both Alex and Molly Drake's godfather.  In 1981, he works as a solicitor under Alex's parents Tim and Caroline Price, representing the murder suspect in episode 1.3, "Nothing Changes.  In episode 1.4, "The Missing Link", CID discover that White has been having an affair with Caroline, and adult Alex uncovers repressed memories of having seen the pair behaving amorously in her youth.  After the death of Alex's parents in a car bomb at the end of episode 1.8, "Alex's Big Day", a video cassette left by Tim revealed that Tim knew about the affair and decided to kill himself, Caroline and Alex.

On the morning of Saturday, 10 October 1981, near the start of the climax of episode 1.8, "Alex's Big Day", Evan and Tim secure the release of their client, Arthur Layton.  The same morning, Evan loans his blue Ford Escort to Tim with which to drive Caroline to a railway station in the company of their young daughter Alex Price, Evan's god-daughter. Layton plants a bomb in the Escort, apparently to aid Tim in carrying out his murder-suicide.

The audience and, presumably, adult Alex Drake see both Layton and Evan standing on the grass, overlooking the explosion in episode 1.8, "Alex's Big Day".  Although Alex (as young Alex Price) remembers having motored past a walking Layton a minute earlier, Evan's presence is unexplained: Gene Hunt and adult Alex leave him at the courthouse when they race to stop the bomb; he is not in Gene's Audi Quattro with Gene and adult Alex; he had already loaned his Escort to Tim; and no other cars are seen behind the speeding Quattro.  When Gene Hunt carries young Alex past him, neither Evan nor young Alex acknowledges each other, nor does Evan run down to the Escort or adult Alex.  For twenty-seven years, Alex will mistakenly remember Evan - rather than Gene Hunt (a stranger to her) - as having been the man rushing toward her in a black overcoat and wrapping himself around her to shield her from the horrific view of her parents' burning corpses.

After the explosion, Evan asks DCI Gene Hunt and DI Drake (i.e. adult Alex) for their help in gaining custody of his god-daughter, young Alex Price, as she has no close blood relatives; and that young Alex never be told the truth that her father killed her mother and himself and tried to kill her.  When adult Alex comments on Gene's destruction of evidence, to wit the unwound and broken video cassette, Hunt replies, "How would you like to go through life knowing that your Daddy tried to blow you to kingdom come?"

The deception is generally assumed [although never confirmed] to have led to Layton blackmailing Evan and to the chain of events that gets Alex shot in 2008 and sent back to 1981 at the beginning of episode 1.1, "Deja Vu".  This theory is expressed by adult Alex to Gene while Evan and child Alex depart CID after Gene destroys the cassette at the end of episode 1.8, "Alex's Big Day".  Recalling what Layton says on the telephone as he escorts her down the gangplank before shooting her in "Deja Vu", she tells Gene, "I'm the piece of his past, or I will be.  He'll be blackmailed by Layton for not telling the truth."

Evan raises Alex Price who, years later as adult Alex Drake, names him godfather of her own daughter, Molly Drake whom he calls "Scrap".  He buys Molly a BlackBerry for her birthday in 2008 and promises to get her a "seriously chocolaty" cake for her party later in the day.  Alex calls him to take care of Molly whilst she completes the paperwork in the aftermath of their mutual hostage situation at the start of episode 1.1, "Deja Vu".  As Evan and Molly begin to walk away, Alex promises Molly that she will be done in time for the two to blow out Molly's candles together.

Young PC
The Young PC (Mason Kayne)  (credited as James Mason) is a ghost who appears in all eight episodes of the third series. He is dressed in an old fashioned police uniform with the epaulette number 6620 visible on his shoulders  and has a horrific injury to the left side of his face, the result of the shotgun blast which killed him. He is first referred to in a 2008 news report at the beginning of episode 1 prior to Alex waking up in a hospital in 1983, and then appears in person throughout the rest of the series at various points, seeming to both be in need Drake’s help and silently offer her guidance.

For the most part he shows very little emotion but is clearly seen to smile eerily at the end of episode 1 when Drake finds a file relating to Sam Tyler  and he is visibly emotionally pained when he appears in the CID offices following the death of Sergeant Viv James in episode 6.

The ghost can only be seen by Alex Drake, although in the series finale Gene Hunt also seems to sense the presence of the ghost standing behind him, but when he turns to look at him directly he is gone. The ghost's reflection is shown briefly in the glass door of Hunt's office and also earlier in the episode, in the place of DCI Gene Hunt when Hunt is struck to the ground by Keats. In both appearances he is shown without any facial injuries.

It is revealed in the climax of the series that the ghost is a 19-year-old Gene Hunt, who was killed on his first week on the beat on Coronation Day in 1953, Alex finds his remains buried in a field in Lancashire along with his Police ID Card. DCI Gene Hunt seems ashamed in some way of his younger self, referring to himself in the third person when he speaks of him. Hunt describes himself as "a skinny lad, needed fattening up", an adage coined by his old mentor PC Morrison.   
 
During the revelation in the farmhouse, Keats refers to Hunt as "This boy in a man's uniform", and then takes great delight in talking about Hunt's immature adolescent machismo particularly towards drinking and women, something which the adult Hunt has never grown out of.

1950s characters

George Dixon
A clip from the 1950s BBC TV series Dixon of Dock Green, with PC George Dixon bidding the audience goodnight, is shown post-credits in the final episode. Dixon originally appeared in the Ealing Studios film The Blue Lamp, in which he was shot and killed. Dixon, played by Jack Warner, subsequently went on to star in Dixon of Dock Green despite the paradox of the character already being dead.

Characters from The Blue Lamp, albeit not George Dixon, had previously received consideration as time travellers in the 1988 BBC Two drama The Black and Blue Lamp, in which Dixon's murderer and a policeman were transposed between the 1950s and the 1980s. The 1980s segment featured a Gene Hunt-like character named Superintendent Cherry, played by Kenneth Cranham.

See also

 List of Life on Mars episodes
 List of Ashes to Ashes episodes

References 

 
Ashes to Ashes
Characters, Ashes to Ashes